The Plymouth red-bellied turtle, sometimes called the Plymouth red-bellied cooter, is a disjunct population of northern red-bellied cooter (Pseudemys rubriventris) endemic to Massachusetts.

Taxonomy
Current thinking is that they are not a full subspecies and that they belong in synonymy under Pseudemys rubriventris or northern red-bellied cooter. Nevertheless, it is well recognized that the Plymouth red-bellied turtle extends the range of the northern red-bellied cooter by 30–40 percent.

Description 
This turtle gets its name from its reddish plastron or undershell. They have flattened or slightly concave vertebral scutes with a red bar on each marginal scute. Their upper shell or carapace ranges from brown to black. An arrow-shaped stripe runs atop head, between the eyes, to their snout. Males have elongated, straight claws on the front feet.

Distribution and habitat 
This species lives in the Plymouth Pinelands of Massachusetts. It spends most of its time in bodies of deep, quickly moving freshwater with muddy bottoms and large amounts of vegetation. It can be found in lakes, ponds, creeks, rivers, streams, and marshes.

Population features 
It was found only in Plymouth County, Massachusetts before the state began trying to establish populations in other areas. The population was reduced to 200–300 turtles by the 1980s. By 2007, there were estimated to be 400–600 breeding age turtles across 20 ponds, and 2011 within 17 ponds.

Ecology and behavior 
The Plymouth red-bellied turtle often suns itself upon rocks in order to maintain its body temperature; however, if it is frightened while doing so, it will go back into the water. During the wintertime, this turtle hibernates in the mud at the bottoms of rivers.

Predators 
Eggs and young turtles are hunted by skunks, raccoons, birds, and fish.

Life cycle 
In spring and summer, the females nest in sand while the males look for food. Females lay 5–17 eggs at a time. Their natural lifespan is 40 to 55 years.

Conservation 
The Plymouth red-bellied turtle is endangered due to overhunting by its natural predator, the striped skunk, and pollution from herbicides dumped into streams and ponds. Loss of habitat, as a result of filling in ponds to create houses is also a major issue. In 1983, Massasoit National Wildlife Refuge was established to help conserve the Plymouth red-bellied turtle. It was the first freshwater turtle in the US to be listed as endangered by the United States Fish and Wildlife Service.

References

External links
Graham, T.E.  Summary report to Mass. Department of Fish and Wildlife, December 31, 1984.

Pseudemys
Turtles of North America
Reptiles of the United States
Endangered fauna of the United States
ESA endangered species